The Lady Aoi is a play written by Yukio Mishima in 1954 which appears in his Five Modern Noh Plays. It modernizes the noh drama Aoi no Ue.

English Version 
Donald Keene has translated this play into English.

Notable productions 

Bahram Beyzai produced this play in Persian in Tehran in 1998.

References 

Plays by Yukio Mishima
1954 plays